The 1975 Washington Huskies football team represented the University of Washington in the 1975 NCAA Division I football season as a member of the Pacific-8 Conference (Pac-8). The Huskies were led by head coach Don James in his first year, and played their home games at Husky Stadium in Seattle.

Preseason
Coming off a 5–6 season in 1974 under Jim Owens, James inherited a veteran squad with most of the talent on the defensive side of the ball, and they would be relied upon as the offense adjusted to running primarily from the I-formation. Fullback Robin Earl, who switched from tight end after four games last season, and center Ray Pinney were the foundation for the change occurring on that side

Schedule

Roster

Game summaries

Washington State

Trailing by thirteen points with three minutes remaining, defensive back Al Burleson returned an interception 93 yards for a touchdown and sophomore quarterback Warren Moon connected with Bob "Spider" Gaines for a 78-yard touchdown pass with less than a minute left to complete the comeback victory in the 

Washington State had dominated the second half and appeared on their way to another score when Burleson picked off John Hopkins and raced down the left sideline to the end zone with less than three minutes remaining.

Coach Don James was surprised by the Cougars electing to pass instead of playing for the field goal, saying "Had they made the field goal it would have put the nail in the coffin."

Following a three-and-out on Washington State's next possession, the Huskies started from their own 22. On the first play, Moon threw into coverage and the ball deflected off Leon Garrett and into the hands of teammate Gaines, who went 40 yards to score.

Until then, the Cougars had controlled the game thanks to fullback Vaughn Williams and tailback Dan Doornink, who appeared unstoppable against the Washington defense.

Washington's first score came on a quarterback sneak by Chris Rowland from the one for a 7-3 lead.

The Huskies scored again before halftime on a 29-yard pass from Moon to Gaines, who had primarily been used as a punt blocker to that point.

Moon had started the season as the starting quarterback, only to be replaced by Rowland after the offense struggled in the first few games.

Statistics

Passing

Moon played in eight games, started six

Rushing

Receiving

Awards
Al Burleson
 Honorable Mention All-American (AP, UPI)
 All-Pac-8
 Pac-8 Player of Week (vs. Navy, USC, Washington State)

Charles Jackson
 Pac-8 Player of Week (vs. Oregon)

Dan Lloyd
 All-Pac-8
 Pac-8 Player of Week (vs. UCLA)
 Guy Flaherty Award (most inspirational)

Ray Pinney
 Honorable Mention All-American (AP, UPI)
 All-Pac-8

NFL Draft selections
Seven University of Washington Huskies were selected in the 1976 NFL Draft, which lasted seventeen rounds with 487 selections.

References

Washington
Washington Huskies football seasons
Washington Huskies football